The 1918 New York state election was held on November 5, 1918, to elect the governor, the lieutenant governor, the secretary state, the state comptroller, the attorney general, the state treasurer and the state engineer, as well as all members of the New York State Assembly and the New York State Senate.

History
This was the first state election following women's suffrage.

The primaries were held on September 3.

Republican primary

Democratic primary

Prohibition primary
The Prohibition state conference in July had designated State Chairman Olin S. Bishop to run in the primary for Governor, but on August 31 the enrolled party members received  a circular from Bishop urging them to vote for the incumbent Republican Governor Charles S. Whitman by writing his name in the ballot. The friends of the incumbent Republican Comptroller Eugene M. Travis gathered enough signatures to put him on the Prohibition primary ballot, and the regular candidate Claude V. Stowell also urged the party members to vote for Travis.

Socialist primary
All Socialist primary candidates won without opposition.

Result
The Democratic candidates for Governor and Lieutenant Governor were elected with the remainder of the Republican ticket.

The incumbents Whitman and Schoeneck were defeated. The incumbents Hugo, Travis, Wells and Williams were re-elected.

Obs.: 
"Blank, void and scattering" votes: 61,052 (Governor)
The number for Travis is total on Republican and Prohibition tickets. The votes given for Governor were used to define the ballot access, and are given separately.

Notes

Sources
Early primary returns: WHITMAN NAMED TO FIGHT SMITH FOR GOVERNORSHIP in NYT on September 4, 1918
Primary results: WHITMAN'S VOTE 295,471 in NYT on September 13, 1918
Result in Westchester County: WHITMAN GAINS ONE VOTE IN THIS CITY in NYT on November 14, 1918
Soldiers' vote in New York City: SOLDIERS ADD 7,419 TO SMITH PLURALITY in NYT on December 18, 1918
Result: SMITH IS SWORN IN AS GOVERNOR in NYT on December 31, 1918
Vote totals taken from The New York Red Book 1919

See also
New York gubernatorial elections

1918
1918 New York (state) elections